Bad Kreuzen is a municipality in the district Perg in the Austrian state of Upper Austria.

History The area around Kreuzen is said to have been cleared by Slavs between the 8th and 11th centuries, and the name Kreuzen is partly interpreted in Slavic terms. In 1147 Otto von Machland donated his clearing parish - Kreuzen - to the Augustinian canons of Waldhausen, which he founded.

Geography
Bad Kreuzen lies 7 km north of the Danube near Grein. About 29 percent of the municipality is forest, and 65 percent is farmland.

References

Spa towns in Austria
Cities and towns in Perg District